Stanislav Kitto (born 30 November 1972) is a former professional footballer, who last played in Estonian Meistriliiga, for JK Trans Narva. He played the position of midfielder. His former clubs include FC TVMK Tallinn and FK Rīga.

He is the Meistriliiga all-time appearances leader with 515 caps.

References

External links
Profile on Narva Trans homepage

1972 births
Living people
Soviet footballers
Estonian footballers
Estonian expatriate footballers
FC Zorya Luhansk players
FC TVMK players
FK Rīga players
Association football midfielders
Expatriate footballers in Ukraine
Expatriate footballers in Latvia
JK Narva Trans players
Ukrainian Premier League players
Estonian expatriate sportspeople in Ukraine
Estonian expatriate sportspeople in Latvia